PCH Games (formerly Candystand.com) is a casual game portal owned by Publishers Clearing House and based in New York City.  Launched in 1997 as The Candystand, by LifeSavers Company, a division of Nabisco, Inc., it was the first major advergame portal available on the World Wide Web.  The site was created for LifeSavers by Skyworks Technologies, an online video game company founded in 1996 by Activision veterans Garry Kitchen and David Crane. In August 2008, Candystand was acquired by Funtank from the Wm. Wrigley Jr. Company.

In December 2010, Publishers Clearing House acquired Candystand.com from Funtank and retained executives Scott Tannen and James Baker.

Candystand is regarded for having a catalog of over 100+ Flash and Shockwave games.  Some of its most popular games include Candystand Billiards, Candystand MiniGolf, Monster Trucks Unleashed, Vector Tower Defense (Vector TD), Slipstream and Fancy Pants Adventure 2.

In February 2016, PCH revamped the site, removing most of the games and emphasizing the lottery aspects over the games. In March 2016, Candystand.com was discontinued by PCH.

Key events

March 30, 1997: Nabisco, managed through its Life Savers portfolio, launches Candystand.com.

2001: Nabisco is acquired by Kraft Foods. After Kraft's acquisition of Nabisco, the tagline "The Hottest Games Online" is introduced.

Spring 2003: Candystand.com did a voting poll on what will be the 5 new flavors for the Life Savers Five Flavor variety.

February 2007: Candystand.com became one of the first free game portals to offer an interface for the Wii at Wii.Candystand.com

November 2008: Candystand.com launched its first iPhone game, Blackbeard's Assault for iPhone 

January 12, 2009: Candystand.com launched Slipstream 2 a sequel to one of the site's most popular games, created by Silent Bay Studios.

June 2009: Candystand rebranded their website with a new layout and the new title "The Sweetest Games Online".

July 1, 2009: Candystand.com launched Let's Dance a rhythm-dance game built in collaboration with Disney and featuring Hannah Montana.

August 2009: Candystand becomes first major game portal to integrate Facebook Connect.

January 2010: several Candystand games are made available on the PSP as well as the iPhone.  Ported titles include Vector TD, Virble, Electric Box and Match Maker.

March 2010: Candystand partners with The Walt Disney Company to integrate Pixie Hollow, a virtual world based on the Disney Fairies and Tinker Bell, directly on the Candystand.com website.

May 2010: In partnership with Trident gum, Candystand.com created and launched a new game titled Trident Layers Factory.  This game marks the first of several new games being developed for Cadbury Adams brands in 2010.

March 2016: Candystand.com has been discontinued and has been replaced by Publishers Clearing House Games.

References

External links
 Candystand.com

Web portals
Browser-based game websites
Internet properties established in 1997